Sir John Gage, 1st Baronet (died 3 October 1633) was an English baronet and landowner, and ancestor of the Viscounts Gage.

Gage was the son of Thomas Gage and Elizabeth Guilford. He married Penelope Darcy, a daughter of Thomas Darcy, 1st Earl Rivers and Mary Kitson, on 28 June 1611. They had eight children. His wife had the possession of Hengrave Hall in Suffolk which she would leave to their third son Edward. This would become the seat of his descendants, the Rokewode-Gage baronets. He was made a baronet, of Firle in Sussex in the Baronetage of England, by Charles I on 26 March 1622. He was succeeded in his title by his eldest son, Thomas. His third son, Edward, was also created a baronet. John  Gage's sister Elizabeth was the mother of the English nun  Dame Gertrude More.

References

Year of birth unknown
Date of birth unknown
1633 deaths
Baronets in the Baronetage of England
17th-century English nobility
John
People from Firle